The following is a list of GCE Ordinary Level subjects offered by Cambridge International Examinations (CAIE).

Cambridge O Levels, Cambridge IGCSE and/or Cambridge International Level 1 or Level 2 Certificates may be taken in the same examination session but certain combinations of subjects are not allowed as described below.

Cambridge O Levels are only available for centres in administrative zones 3, 4 & 5.

 Partial means that only some components are available for that session.

See also
 Cambridge International Examinations (CAIE)
 University of Cambridge Local Examinations Syndicate (UCLES)
 GCE Ordinary Level
 GCE Advanced Level
Cambridge O level and A level Past Paper to Marks Scheme Searcher
 List of CAIE Advanced Level subjects

References

External links
 Cambridge International Examinations Official Site
 CIE O Level Subject List (those available internationally only)

Qualification awarding bodies in the United Kingdom
University of Cambridge-related lists
Cambridge International Examinations